Marovoay is an urban municipality in north-western Madagascar. It belongs to the district of Marovoay, which is a part of Boeny Region. The population of the commune was estimated to be approximately 65,000 in 2001 commune census.

Marovoay has a riverine harbour. In addition to primary schooling the town offers secondary education at both junior and senior levels. The town provides access to hospital services to its citizens.
Marovoay is situated at 41 km from the Ankarafantsika National Park.

The majority 60% of the population of the commune are farmers, while an additional 24% receives their livelihood from raising livestock. The most important crop is rice, while other important products are cassava and sweet potatoes.  Industry and services provide employment for 2% and 10% of the population, respectively. Additionally fishing employs 4% of the population.

Rivers
The main river is the Betsiboka River.

Roads
The town is situated at the National road 4 to Mahajanga. Also the National road 8b crosses the municipality but this is in a very bad state of conservation.

References 

Cities in Madagascar
Populated places in Boeny